Dan Lee Briggs (born November 18, 1952) is a retired professional baseball player. He played seven seasons for the California Angels, Cleveland Indians, San Diego Padres, Montreal Expos, and Chicago Cubs of Major League Baseball. He also played one season and part of another in Japan with the Yakult Swallows.

External links

1952 births
Living people
American expatriate baseball players in Canada
American expatriate baseball players in Japan
Baseball players from California
California Angels players
Chicago Cubs players
Cleveland Indians players
Columbus Clippers players
Denver Bears players
El Paso Diablos players
El Paso Sun Kings players
Idaho Falls Angels players
Indianapolis Indians players
Iowa Cubs players
Major League Baseball first basemen
Major League Baseball outfielders
Montreal Expos players
Nippon Professional Baseball first basemen
Nippon Professional Baseball outfielders
People from Scotia, California
Portland Beavers players
Quad Cities Angels players
San Diego Padres players
Salinas Packers players
Salt Lake City Angels players
Salt Lake City Gulls players
Stockton Ports players
Yakult Swallows players